Ann Dustin Wilson (born June 19, 1950) is an American singer best known as the lead singer of the rock band Heart.

Wilson has been a member of Heart since the early 1970s; her younger sister, Nancy, is also a member of the band. The first hard rock band fronted by women, Heart released numerous albums between 1976 and 2016; the early Heart albums Dreamboat Annie (1976), and Little Queen (1977) generated classic hard rock singles such as "Magic Man", "Crazy on You", and "Barracuda". All told, Heart has sold over 35 million records worldwide, placed 29 singles on the Billboard Hot 100, and has scored top 10 albums on the Billboard 200 in the 1970s, 1980s, 1990s, and 2010s.

Ann Wilson was ranked no. 78 in Hit Parader's 2006 list of "Greatest Heavy Metal Vocalists of All Time". In 2013, she was inducted into the Rock and Roll Hall of Fame as a member of Heart. Wilson possesses a lyric soprano vocal range. She is known for her operatic abilities.

Early life
Ann Dustin Wilson was born in San Diego, California. Her father was a major in the U.S. Marine Corps. Due to her father's military career, the Wilson family moved frequently. They lived near American military facilities in Panama and Taiwan before settling in Seattle, Washington, in the early 1960s. To maintain a sense of home no matter where in the world they were residing, the Wilsons turned to music. "On Sunday we'd have pancakes and opera," her sister Nancy Wilson recalled. "My dad would be conducting in the living room. We'd turn it way up and rock. There was everything from classical music to Ray Charles, Judy Garland, Peggy Lee, bossa nova, and early experimental electronic music."

Wilson's family eventually settled in Bellevue, a suburb of Seattle, Washington. In 1968, she graduated from Sammamish High School. Shy because of a stutter, Wilson sought fulfillment in music. In the early 1970s she joined a local band, White Heart, which changed its name to Hocus Pocus, and then in 1974 to Heart. Wilson also attended Cornish College of the Arts.
However, Ann mentioned in 1976 during the KWSU taping that they were from Vancouver BC.

Career

Wilson's younger sister, Nancy, joined Heart, and the band moved to Canada. Heart recorded their first album Dreamboat Annie in Vancouver in 1975. It was released in the United States in 1976, with "Magic Man" becoming Heart's first Top 10 hit in the United States, peaking at No. 9 on the Billboard Hot 100, and "Crazy on You" hitting number 35. Both songs were co-written by Ann and Nancy Wilson. In 1977, Little Queen was released, and in 1978, Dog & Butterfly. In 1992, Wilson appeared on Alice in Chains' EP Sap; she sang on "Brother" and "Am I Inside".

The Wilson sisters started a recording studio, Bad Animals, in Seattle in the mid-1990s. They formed a side band, the Lovemongers, which performed Led Zeppelin's song "The Battle of Evermore" on the 1992 soundtrack to the Cameron Crowe (Nancy's then husband) movie Singles, and later released a four-song EP. The Lovemongers' debut album Whirlygig was released in 1997.

Wilson joined producer Alan Parsons in A Walk Down Abbey Road, the 2001 live tribute tour to Beatles music.

Wilson's first solo album, Hope & Glory, was released on September 11, 2007. Hope & Glory features guest appearances from Elton John, k.d. lang, Alison Krauss, Gretchen Wilson, Shawn Colvin, Rufus Wainwright, Wynonna Judd, and Deana Carter. Nancy Wilson also contributed. Three singles were released from the project: "Little Problems, Little Lies", "Isolation", and a cover of Led Zeppelin's "Immigrant Song."

On November 22, 2012, Wilson sang an original arrangement of "The Star-Spangled Banner", accompanied by the Dallas Symphony Orchestra, at the beginning of the Thanksgiving Day football game between the Dallas Cowboys and Washington Redskins.

The Wilson sisters performed at the Kennedy Center tribute to Led Zeppelin on December 2, 2012. Present at the event were the three living members of Led Zeppelin, Robert Plant, Jimmy Page and John Paul Jones. The Wilsons performed "Stairway To Heaven", backed by an orchestra and a choir, and featuring drummer Jason Bonham (son of Led Zeppelin drummer John Bonham).

On July 13, 2015, Wilson announced a solo tour, The Ann Wilson Thing, which began on September 21. She released her first EP, The Ann Wilson Thing! – #1, digitally on September 18, 2015. On July 22, 2016, Wilson announced the release of focus, the second EP from The Ann Wilson Thing! Wilson played a Florida mini-tour in September 2016 as The Ann Wilson Thing! in support of this release.

On October 12, 2017, Wilson's first feature film, Ann Wilson: In Focus was released. It featured an intimate interview conducted in her home by Criss Cain along with 20 complete live song performances from the Ann Wilson of Heart tour stop in Wilmington, North Carolina, on March 21, 2017.

Wilson and Alice in Chains' guitarist and vocalist Jerry Cantrell paid tribute to their late friend, Chris Cornell, with a rendition of Soundgarden's "Black Hole Sun" during the Rock and Roll Hall of Fame ceremony on April 14, 2018.

On August 3, 2018, Wilson released "You Don't Own Me" as the second single from her solo album, Immortal. Released on September 14, 2018, the album features ten tracks that pay tribute to Wilson's influences and friends.

In May 2021, Wilson announced her first dates since the COVID-19 pandemic with the Rite of June mini-tour.

In 2022, Wilson was nominated for consideration into the 2023 Songwriters Hall of Fame.

In November 2022 Wilson was featured on the Disturbed song "Don't Tell Me" from their album Divisive.  The song reached number 2 on Billboard's Hard Rock Song Sales chart.

Personal life

Relationships and family
During the 1970s, Wilson was in a relationship with Michael Fisher, the manager of Heart, while Nancy was involved with lead guitarist Roger Fisher, Michael's younger brother. Both couples controlled the band. In 1979, the relationships ended; Ann stated that Michael had fallen in love with another woman and they parted.

Ann Wilson adopted her daughter Marie in 1991 and her son Dustin in 1998.

Wilson married Dean Wetter in April 2015. The pair had dated briefly in the 1980s. On the morning of August 27, 2016, Wetter was arrested for assaulting Nancy Wilson's 16-year-old twin sons after the boys had left the door to his RV open. The incident took place during a Heart performance at the White River Amphitheater in Auburn, Washington, the previous night. Wetter later pleaded guilty to the charges.

The sisters' relationship was strained by the incident. Following the end of Heart's 2016 tour, the sisters opted to tour with their own side-project bands, with Ann saying in April 2017 that Heart was on hiatus.

In February 2019, the sisters announced that Heart's hiatus had ended and that the band would embark on the Love Alive tour in the summer. In March 2019, the sisters reunited on stage for the first time since the band went on hiatus, at the Love Rocks NYC benefit concert.

Health
As a child, Ann was bullied for being overweight. She revealed that in the 1970s and into the early 1980s she would starve herself and use diet pills to stay thin. By the time Heart made a comeback in the mid-'80s, she had gained a significant amount of weight. Fearing that Heart's lead singer's figure would compromise the band's image, record company executives and band members began pressuring her to lose weight. In music videos, camera angles and clothes were often used to minimize her size, and more focus was put on Ann's more slender sister, Nancy. Ann stated she began suffering from stress-related panic attacks due to the negative publicity surrounding her weight. She underwent adjustable gastric band weight-loss surgery in January 2002 after what she called "a lifelong battle" with her weight.

In November 2009, Ann collapsed. Doctors found that she had liver disease resulting from alcohol. While she had stopped using other drugs after adopting her daughter, she had increased her alcohol consumption. Nancy and other family members and band crew had been concerned about her for some time, had planned to confront her about it, and had even built a break into a Heart tour to allow Ann an opportunity to obtain treatment. She ultimately underwent therapy on her own. In the band's 2012 autobiography, Ann revealed her past struggles with cocaine and alcoholism. She stated that she had been sober since 2009.

Discography

Studio albums

Extended plays

Singles

Other appearances

Live albums

Compilations

Notes

References

External links

Official Site of Ann Wilson
Official site of Heart

1950 births
American flautists
American sopranos
American women rock singers
Living people
Musicians from San Diego
Musicians from Seattle
People from Bellevue, Washington
Cornish College of the Arts alumni
Heart (band) members
21st-century American women singers
American people of French descent
American people of Scottish descent
21st-century American singers
21st-century flautists